France is scheduled to compete at the 2017 World Aquatics Championships in Budapest, Hungary from 14 July to 30 July. Participants are yet unknown.

Medalists

Diving

France has entered 4 divers (three male and one female).

Individual

Team

High diving

France qualified one male high diver.

Open water swimming

France has entered seven open water swimmers

Swimming

French swimmers have achieved qualifying standards in the following events (up to a maximum of 2 swimmers in each event at the A-standard entry time, and 1 at the B-standard):

Men

Women

Synchronized swimming

France's synchronized swimming team consisted of 12 athletes (12 female).

Women

 Legend: (R) = Reserve Athlete

Water polo

France qualified both a men's and women's teams.

Men's tournament

Team roster

Remi Garsau
Remi Saudadier
Igor Kovacevic
Logan Piot
Dino Guillaume
Thibaut Simon
Ugo Crousillat (C)
Michal Izdinsky
Mehdi Marzouki
Manuel Laversanne
Mathieu Peisson
Alexandre Camarasa
Hugo Fontani

Group play

13th–16th place semifinals

13th place game

Women's tournament

Team roster

Lou Counil
Estelle Millot
Lea Bachelier
Aurore Sacre
Louise Guillet (C)
Geraldine Mahieu
Clementine Valverde
Aurelie Battu
Adeline Sacre
Yaelle Deschampt
Marie Barbieux
Audrey Daule
Lorene Derenty

Group play

Playoffs

9th–12th place semifinals

Eleventh place game

References

Nations at the 2017 World Aquatics Championships
France at the World Aquatics Championships
2017 in French sport